Center Township Grade and High School, also known as Mays Elementary School, is a historic school building located at Rushville, Rush County, Indiana.  It was built in 1929, and is a -story, brick building with Classical Revival and Prairie School style design elements. It has a flat topped hipped roof, overhanging eaves, and sparse stone and brick detailing.

It was listed on the National Register of Historic Places in 2004.

References

School buildings on the National Register of Historic Places in Indiana
Neoclassical architecture in Indiana
Prairie School architecture in Indiana
School buildings completed in 1929
Buildings and structures in Rush County, Indiana
National Register of Historic Places in Rush County, Indiana
1929 establishments in Indiana